Manuele Zaccaria (died 1287/88) was the Genoese lord of Phocaea and its profitable alum mines, which he received as a fief from the Byzantine Emperor, from 1275 until his death in 1287/88. He was succeeded by his brother, Benedetto I Zaccaria.

His parents were Fulcone Zaccaria and one of his wives: Giulietta or Beatrice. Manuele married Clarisia Fieschi, and had four sons, Tedisio, Leonardo, Odoardo and Manfredo.

Sources 
 
 

1280s deaths
13th-century Byzantine people
13th-century Genoese people
Manuele
Year of birth unknown